Jan Wróblewski was born in 1940, he became World champion in 1965 and 1972. He received the Lilienthal Gliding Medal in 1972. During his career he flew more than 10,300 hours.

Achievements

References

Further reading 
 
 Mała encyklopedia sportu, tom II: L-Ż (przewodniczący Komitetu Redakcyjnego Kajetan Hądzelek), Wydawnictwo "Sport i Turystyka", Warsaw 1987, p. 631

External links 
 Odznaczenia FAI indywidualnych dyscyplin lotniczych  
 Szkic Historyczny Aeroklubu Bydgoskiego

Polish glider pilots
1940 births
Lilienthal Gliding Medal recipients
Living people
Sportspeople from Bydgoszcz